Roger Chapman is a musician.

Roger Chapman may also refer to:
Roger Chapman (golfer) (born 1959), English golfer
Roger Chapman (submariner), submariner rescued from sunken submersible Pisces III in 1973
Roger Chapman (MP)